Oruro Royal is the oldest Bolivian football club from Oruro. The club plays in the Oruro Primera A, one of the third-division regional leagues. Oruro Royal was founded on 26 May 1896 by the English workers hired by the Bolivian Government to build the national railways, becoming the first Bolivian football squad.  It plays its home games at the Estadio Jesús Bermúdez.

The first squad is composed of: Felipe Niño de Guzmán, Zenón Eizaguirre, Luís Aguirre, Augusto Gunther, Alberto Aguirre, Luís Vásquez, Ricardo Martínez, Telésforo Ross, Rafael Vásquez, Hans Geberber and Ernesto Galzin.

Association football clubs established in 1896
Football clubs in Bolivia
1896 establishments in Bolivia
Railway association football teams